Victory is a John Trudeau designed 1987 solid state pinball machine by Premier and licensed under Gottlieb.

Description
It was the first pinball machine to use a completely screened photo-realistic Vitrigraph. Other games had the silk screen on the wood. The table sold 3,100 units. The game was designed by John Trudeau, the artwork was by Constanitino Mitchell and sound by Dave Zabriskie.

Gameplay
Victory is a driving themed game. The goal is to get the ball into all seven targets (or as the game refers to them as checkpoints) and to then finish the race by making the ball go through the checkered spinner.

Design team
 Concept: Ed Krynski
 Game Design: John Trudeau
 Mechanics: John Borg
 Artwork: Constantino Mitchell, Jeanine Mitchell
 Animation: Ed Krynski, Mark West
 Sound: Dave Zabriskie

Digital version
Victory is a playable table in Pinball Hall of Fame: The Gottlieb Collection as well as The Pinball Arcade on multiple platforms as a licensed table.

References

External links
 IPDB Listing for Victory

1987 pinball machines
Gottlieb pinball machines